Manipura, also known as Manalura, is a kingdom mentioned in the Hindu epic Mahabharata. According to the epic, it was located near a sea-shore, the Mahendra Mountains (present day Eastern Ghats) and the Kalinga Kingdom (present day Odisha). Arjuna—one of the five Pandava brothers—visited Manipura and married Chitrangada, the princess of the kingdom.  They had a son named Babruvahana who later ruled it.

Manipur shares its name with a modern-day state of India, located in the North-Eastern part of the country. Some past rulers of the state had claimed themselves to be the descendants of Arjuna. While some scholars support  the identification of the state with the kingdom, others oppose this idea and based on the geographical description given in the epic, they state that Manipura kingdom was in present-day Odisha.

Legend

In the Mahabharata, Arjuna was one of the Pandava brothers and they shared a common wife named Draupadi. To prevent jealousy among the brothers and identify the paternity of Draupadi's children, the Pandavas followed a condition in which one brother was given a year with her and others were forbidden to enter her chamber. If the condition was violated, the brother, who entered the room, had to go on a pilgrimage for a year. Once, when Yudhishthira—the eldest brother—was spending time with Draupadi, Arjuna entered the room to take his weapon.

As a result, Arjuna was exiled and he spent his time roaming around the subcontinent. During this period, he married a Naga lady named Ulupi, with whom he spent a night and continued his journey. 
He reached the kingdom of Manipur, which was then reigned by King Chitravahana. According to the Adi Parva of the epic, Arjuna reached Manipur after crossing the kingdom of Kalinga, the Mahendra Mountains and the sea-shore.

Chitravahana had only a daughter, Chitrangada, who was very beautiful and was trained as a warrior. Arjuna fell in love with her and asked her hand in marriage to her father. Chitravahana agreed but stated that the heir must inherit the throne of Manipur. After a son was born, Arjuna left the kingdom and continued his journey. His son was named Babruvahana and he became the king of Manipur after he reached maturity.

The next appearance of Manipur is in the Ashvamedhika Parva of the epic. After coming victorious in the Kurukshetra War, Yudhishthira performed Ashvamedha Yajna to expand his kingdom. A horse was loose free and the royal soldiers, led by Arjuna, followed it. When the horse reached Manipur, it was stopped was King Babruvahana. Arjuna and Babruvahana were not aware of each other's identity and a battle between them began. Chitrangada heard about it and rushed to stop it; however Babruvahana killed many warriors, including Arjuna. Ulupi, who was present there, revived Arjuna using a gem and revealed that Arjuna was killed because of the curse of celestial Vasus. Chitrangada told her husband about his son and all were happy to be reunited.

Identification

The "Vijay Panchali" (also spelled as "Bijoy Panchali"), a work written by Shantidas Goswami, a Hindu missionary, presented northeast India's Manipur as the "Manipur" mentioned in the Mahabharata, also claimed Babruvahana (Arjuna's son) as the father of Meitei King Nongda Lairen Pakhangba (33 AD). Moreover, the work gives King Nongda Lairen Pakhangba of northeast India's Manipur an Indo-Aryan name "Yavistha". The identification of the kingdom with the modern day state has been controversial and not generally accepted by historians and scholars. "A Short History of Manipur", a book by Rajkumar Jhalajit Singh, was banned from publishing or selling by the author's own family members, because according to them, the book misleads the readers that the Manipuris are the descendants of Arjuna of the Mahabharata.

The Chapter 217 of the "Arjuna-vanavasa Parva" of the Adi Parva section of the Mahabharata describes the landmarks of the location of the "Manipura" kingdom as situated near the Kalinga (Mahabharata) (present day Odisha), the Mahendra Mountains (present day Eastern Ghats) and in the coastal area.

"Manipura" in the Mahabharata is located in a sea-shore region near the Kalinga (Mahabharata) (present day Odisha). According to one theory, if it was the present day Northeast Indian state of Manipur, then the Mahabharata will absolutely mention the Vanga Kingdom regarding the journey of Arjuna as it was on the way to Northeast India. But the Vanga kingdom wasn't mentioned in the Mahabharata's narratives of Arjuna's journey to "Manipura".

Another identification of the kingdom is with a place named "Manipura" (20°33'48"N, 86°22'17"E) in Kendrapara district of present day Odisha, near the River Gobari, that discharges its waters directly into the Bay of Bengal. "Manipura" is located 10 km westward to  the Kendrapara town. It is situated 50 km westward to the Manipura dis-tributary of the Brahmani River.

Notes

References

Bibliography 
 
 

Locations in Hindu mythology
Kingdoms in the Mahabharata